Douglas Vipond (born 15 October 1966) is a Scottish broadcaster and drummer.

Early life
Vipond was brought up in Inchinnan and attended Park Mains High School in Erskine, choosing to go there because of the reputation of the music department. After school he enrolled at Glasgow's Royal Scottish Academy of Music to study orchestral percussion.

Deacon Blue
Vipond was one of the founding members of pop band Deacon Blue along with Ricky Ross and Lorraine McIntosh. Their 1988 hit "Real Gone Kid" peaked at number 8 in the UK Singles Chart. They have had 12 UK Top 40 singles and two No.1 albums. He remains an active recording and touring member of the group alongside his broadcasting career.

Television career
On television and radio Vipond has fronted sport, travel and rural affairs programmes. He has presented a range of sporting events including Scottish Cup Finals, International Rugby, Melrose 7s, World Championship Mountain Biking, Three Day Eventing and Bowls World Championship. He can also be seen covering Scotland's nightly sports news on Reporting Scotland.

He was one of the BBC's presenters for the Commonwealth Games in Glasgow.

He also presents BBC Scotland's The Adventure Show and the rural affairs series, Landward. He has also been a presenter on BBC1's The Holiday Show, among others, and even stood in for Richard Madeley on ITV's This Morning.

St Mirren
Vipond is a supporter of the Paisley based football club St Mirren, he became a supporter after Alex Ferguson, then St Mirren's manager brought Tony Fitzpatrick and Bobby Reid to his school to meet the pupils. He has presented souvenir videos for St Mirren.

References

External links
Dougie Vipond BBC Press Office

1966 births
Living people
People from Renfrewshire
Scottish drummers
British male drummers
Scottish television presenters
People educated at Park Mains High School
BBC sports presenters and reporters
BBC television presenters
Deacon Blue members